Waterloo is a railway station in the town of Waterloo, Walloon Brabant, Belgium. The station opened on 1 February 1874 and is located on line 124. The train services are operated by National Railway Company of Belgium (NMBS).

The station is large, with platforms able to accommodate trains much longer than any currently scheduled to operate to (or through) the station. It is fully staffed, with the booking office open seven days a week.

The railway line between Nivelles-Waterloo-Linkebeek (south of Brussels) is currently being enlarged to allow a higher frequency of local and intercity trains.

Train services
There is at least one train every hour in each direction at Waterloo. The station is served by the following services:

Intercity services (IC-27) Brussels Airport - Brussels-Luxembourg - Nivelles - Charleroi (weekdays)
Brussels RER services (S1) Antwerp - Mechelen - Brussels - Waterloo - Nivelles (weekdays)
Brussels RER services (S1) Brussels - Waterloo - Nivelles (weekends)
Brussels RER services (S9) Leuven - Brussels-Luxembourg - Etterbeek - Braine-l'Alleud (weekdays)

See also
 List of railway stations in Belgium

References

External links
 

Railway stations in Belgium
Railway stations opened in 1874
Railway stations in Walloon Brabant
Waterloo, Belgium